Boddicker is a surname. Notable people with the surname include:

 Michael Boddicker (born 1953), American film composer and electronic musician.
 Mike Boddicker (born 1957), Major League Baseball pitcher.
 Zach Boddicker, American guitarist

See also
 Clarence Boddicker, fictional character from RoboCop
 Zombie Apocalypse (band), also known as Boddicker